Norwalk High School is a public high school, part of the Norwalk Community School District, located in the town of Norwalk, Iowa, which is roughly five miles south of Des Moines.

Activities 
Students at Norwalk High School can participate in numerous activities, including Drama, Marching Band, Jazz Band, Choir, Show Choir, Blackshirts Tech Warriors and Cheerleading.

Athletics
The Warriors compete in the Little Hawkeye Conference in the following sports:

Baseball
 3-time Class 3A State Champions (1982, 2009, 2020) 
Basketball (boys and girls)
 Girls' - 2-time State Champions (1981, 2006) 
 Boys’ - 1-time State Champion (2020)
Bowling (boys and girls)
Cross Country (boys and girls)
 Boys' - Won the hearts of fans all over Iowa with the Funny Hat No Shirt Crew
Football
Golf (boys and girls)
Soccer (boys and girls)
 Boys' - 4-time state champs (2007(1A), 2014(2A), 2016(2A), 2017(2A))
Softball
 2005 Class 3A State Champions 
Tennis (boys and girls)
Track and Field (boys and girls)
Volleyball
Wrestling

Notable alumni
Matt Dermody, Major League Baseball pitcher
Joel Hanrahan, former Major League Baseball pitcher
Jason Momoa, Actor (Aquaman) 
Jeremy Stephens, professional mixed martial artist, currently competing in the UFC's Featherweight Division
Brandon Routh, Actor (Superman Returns)

See also
List of high schools in Iowa

References

External links
Norwalk Community School District

Education in Warren County, Iowa
Educational institutions in the United States with year of establishment missing
Public high schools in Iowa